Kim Sang-woo (born July 31, 1973) is a retired volleyball player from South Korea, who currently coaches Seoul Woori Card Wibee in the V-League. As a player Kim was a middle blocker and helped the Samsung Bluefangs win nine consecutive national championships in the amateur Super League (1997−2004) and pro V-League (2005).

Kim competed with the South Korean national team from 1994 to 2002 and took part in the 1996 Summer Olympics. He was also honored as best spiker at the 2001 FIVB World Grand Champions Cup in Japan.

Individual awards
 2001 FIVB World Grand Champions Cup "Best Spiker"

External links
 Kim Sang-woo profile at Sports Reference

1973 births
Living people
South Korean men's volleyball players
Asian Games medalists in volleyball
Volleyball players at the 1996 Summer Olympics
Volleyball players at the 1994 Asian Games
Volleyball players at the 1998 Asian Games
Volleyball players at the 2002 Asian Games
Sungkyunkwan University alumni
Olympic volleyball players of South Korea
Daejeon Samsung Bluefangs players
Asian Games gold medalists for South Korea
Asian Games silver medalists for South Korea
Asian Games bronze medalists for South Korea
Medalists at the 1994 Asian Games
Medalists at the 1998 Asian Games
Medalists at the 2002 Asian Games
20th-century South Korean people
21st-century South Korean people